Vivian Jepkemoi Cheruiyot (born 11 September 1983) is a Kenyan long-distance runner who specialises in track and cross country running.  She represented Kenya at the Summer Olympics in 2000, 2008, 2012, and 2016, winning a silver medal at the 5000 m and bronze medal at the 10000 m at the 2012 Olympics, silver medal at the 10000 m and gold medal at the 5000 m at the 2016 Olympics, setting the new Olympic record in 5000 m event. Cheruiyot won a silver medal in the 5000 metres at the 2007 World Championships in Athletics and became the world champion in the event at the 2009 edition, repeating this achievement at the 2011 World Championships, where she also won the 10000 m.

After taking a silver at the 2010 IAAF World Indoor Championships, she won a number of outdoor titles that year, becoming African champion, Commonwealth Games champion and IAAF Continental Cup champion, as well as winning the 2010 IAAF Diamond League title.

She holds the Kenyan record and Commonwealth record for the 10,000 m with her best time of 29:32.53, which was set at the Rio Olympics in 2016.

Career
Cheruiyot is trained by Ricky Simms. She was born near Keiyo in the Rift Valley Province, coming from the same village as another female runner Alice Timbilili.

Her breakthrough year came in 1999: at the age of fifteen she took the junior silver medal at the 1999 IAAF World Cross Country Championships behind Werknesh Kidane. At the 1999 World Youth Championships in Athletics she won the bronze medal in the 3000 metres. She earned a senior call-up for the 1999 All-Africa Games, where she managed a bronze medal in the 5000 metres. She became the junior champion at the 2000 IAAF World Cross Country Championships. She gained selection for the 2000 Olympic Games and reached the 5000 m final after setting personal bests in the qualifying rounds. She was much slower in the final and was the last runner to finish.

Vivian Cheruiyot won the silver medal at the 5000 m final of the 2007 World Championships at Osaka in 14:58.50, behind Meseret Defar (14:57.91).

In early 2009 she broke the Kenyan 3000 metres indoor record (8:30.53) in Birmingham and won the World's Best 10K race in Puerto Rico. In May she won the Great Manchester Run 10K race. Cheruiyot won the women's 5000 m at the 2009 World Championships in Berlin with a time of 14 minutes 58.33 seconds, while countrywoman Sylvia Kibet took the silver. She closed the track season with a 3000 m silver and a 5000 m bronze medal at the 2009 IAAF World Athletics Final. She won the 2009 New Year's Eve San Silvestre Vallecana race.

She retained her World's Best 10K title in 2010. An appearance at the 2010 IAAF World Indoor Championships resulted in a silver medal in the 3000 m behind Meseret Defar. She headed the Kenyan 5000 m challenge at the 2010 African Championships in Athletics in Nairobi and beat Defar on this occasion to take the African title. After this, her main focus of the year was the 2010 IAAF Diamond League. She took victories in the 5000 m at the Meeting Areva and Memorial van Damme and was elected the inaugural Diamond League Trophy winner for the event on overall points. She defeated Sentayehu Ejigu at the 2010 IAAF Continental Cup to take the 5000 m gold medal for Africa. Another gold medal in the event came at the 2010 Commonwealth Games in Delhi, where she headed a Kenyan podium sweep with Sylvia Kibet and Ines Chenonge. She returned to Kenya to train and took an 8 km win at the Tuskys Cross Country meeting. She ended the year on a high note with a win at the BOclassic 5K race on New Year's Eve.

Cheruiyot began preparing for the World Cross Country Championships in January 2011 and came third at the Great Edinburgh Cross Country before overhauling Linet Masai to win the Cross de Itálica in Seville. A second-place finish at the Kenyan Cross Country Championships guaranteed her a place in the Kenyan squad and, in contrast to her successes on the track, she was looking to win her first cross country medal on the world stage. Her rival Masai led the initial charge at the 2011 IAAF World Cross Country Championships, but Cheruiyot broke away on the final lap to secure the gold medal and lead Kenya to the women's team title.

She started 2012 with a win at the World's Best 10K and improved her best on the roads to 30:47 minutes. She opened the 2012 Diamond League circuit with narrow wins ahead of Meseret Defar, first in the 3000 m in Doha then over 5000 m in Rome. She guaranteed her place at the Olympics by winning the 10,000 m trial in Nairobi in June. At the Olympics, she won a silver medal in the 5000 metres and a bronze medal at the 10000 metres.

In 2018, she won the 2018 London Marathon with a time of 2:18:31.

She finished second in the 2018 New York City Marathon, finishing in 2:26:02 far behind winner Mary Keitany in 2:22:48, and 20 seconds ahead of Shalane Flanagan who finished in 2:26:22.

Personal bests

All information taken from IAAF profile.

Achievements

Note: XC = Cross Country

Laureus World Sports Award for Sportswoman of the Year: 2012

Marathon competition record

References

External links

 
 
 

 Read Vivian Cheruiyot's Rising Star Profile on spikesmag.com

1983 births
Living people
People from Elgeyo-Marakwet County
Kenyan female long-distance runners
Olympic athletes of Kenya
Olympic gold medalists for Kenya
Olympic silver medalists for Kenya
Olympic bronze medalists for Kenya
Athletes (track and field) at the 2000 Summer Olympics
Athletes (track and field) at the 2008 Summer Olympics
Athletes (track and field) at the 2012 Summer Olympics
Athletes (track and field) at the 2016 Summer Olympics
Medalists at the 2012 Summer Olympics
Medalists at the 2016 Summer Olympics
Commonwealth Games gold medallists for Kenya
Commonwealth Games medallists in athletics
Athletes (track and field) at the 2010 Commonwealth Games
World Athletics Championships athletes for Kenya
World Athletics Championships medalists
World Athletics Cross Country Championships winners
Laureus World Sports Awards winners
Kalenjin people
Olympic gold medalists in athletics (track and field)
Olympic silver medalists in athletics (track and field)
Olympic bronze medalists in athletics (track and field)
African Games bronze medalists for Kenya
African Games medalists in athletics (track and field)
Kenyan female cross country runners
London Marathon female winners
Olympic female long-distance runners
Track & Field News Athlete of the Year winners
Athletes (track and field) at the 1999 All-Africa Games
Diamond League winners
IAAF Continental Cup winners
World Athletics Championships winners
Medallists at the 2010 Commonwealth Games